The Central Nebraska League was an Independent level minor league baseball league that played in the 1903 season. The five–team Central Nebraska League consisted of franchises based exclusively in Nebraska. The Central Nebraska League played just one season and permanently folded after the 1903 season.

History
The Central Nebraska League began play as an Independent level minor league in 1903, The five members were the teams based in Giltner, Nebraska, Holdrege, Nebraska, McCook, Nebraska, Minden, Nebraska and Red Cloud, Nebraska.

The league began the season calling itself the Southwestern Nebraska Baseball League. The first published standings of the league had the Holdrege and McCook teams tied for 1st place with 4–0 records on June 19, 1903. Giltner was next with a 3–3 record, followed by Red Cloud 1–5 and Minden 0–4.

On June 19, the "S.W. Nebraska League" published standings showed Holdrege in 1st place with an 8–1 record. McCook was in 2nd place at 7–3, followed by Minden 3–4, Giltner 3–6 and Red Cloud 1–7.

In standings published on July 3, 1903, the league is first called the "Central Nebraska League." Holdrege was in 1st place with a 10–2 record, followed by McCook at 7–3. Giltner was in 3rd place with a record of 5–8, followed by Minden at 3–7 and Red Cloud 1–11.

Newspaper records indicate that through July 24, 1903, Holdrege and McCook were tied for 1st place with 19–7 records. The standings were published shortly before the Minden and Giltner teams both disbanded. When Red Cloud and McCook disbanded shortly after, this left only Holdrege remaining. Holdrege then finished the season as a travelling team. The Central Nebraska League permanently folded after the 1903 season.

1903 Central Nebraska League teams

Central Nebraska League standings

1903
The exact team records and standings of the 1903 Central Nebraska League are unknown. The last known standings were published on July 24, 1903, shortly before Minden and Giltner disbanded. Red Cloud and McCook would disband shortly thereafter, leaving only Holdrege as a traveling team.

as of July 24, 1903

References

Defunct minor baseball leagues in the United States
Baseball leagues in Nebraska
Defunct professional sports leagues in the United States
Sports leagues established in 1903
Sports leagues disestablished in 1903
Baseball in Nebraska